The PEN/Nabokov Award for Achievement in International Literature, commonly referred to as the PEN/Nabokov Award, is awarded biennially by PEN America (formerly PEN American Center) to writers, principally novelists, "whose works evoke to some measure Nabokov's brilliant versatility and commitment to literature as a search for the deepest truth and the highest pleasure— what Nabokov called the 'indescribable tingle of the spine'." The winner is awarded $50,000 as of 2016. The award is financed by the Vladimir Nabokov Foundation, founded by Dmitri Nabokov. It has been called one of the most prestigious PEN prizes.

In 2016, after an eight year hiatus, the award was revived with changes. The prize money was increased from US$20,000 to US$50,000, and the name was changed from PEN/Nabokov Award for Fiction to PEN/Nabokov Award for Achievement in International Literature. The criteria of the award was changed to those born or residing outside the United States, meaning previous winners Ozick, Roth, and Gass wouldn't have qualified for this version of the award.

The award is one of many PEN awards sponsored by International PEN affiliates in over 145 PEN centres around the world. The PEN American Center awards have been characterized as being among the "major" American literary prizes.

Award winners

Notes

External links
PEN/Nabokov Award, official website.

PEN America awards
Awards established in 2000
2000 establishments in the United States
American fiction awards
Vladimir Nabokov